Al-Ghazaly High School in Wayne, in Passaic County, New Jersey, is one of the oldest Islamic high schools in the United States. The school was founded in 1984, and serves students in seventh through twelfth grades. The principal is Sr. Khaldiya Mustafa. Most students at Al-Ghazaly High School come from Al-Ghazaly and Al Hikmah Elementary School, located at Communipaw Avenue in Jersey City and North 8th Street in Prospect Park, respectively.

As of the 2019–20 school year, the school had an enrollment of 334 students and 33.3 classroom teachers (on an FTE basis), for a student–teacher ratio of 10:1. The school's student body was 54.5% (182) White, 30.2% (101) Asian, 12.0% (40) Black, 1.8% (6) Hispanic and 1.5% (5) two or more races.

Al-Ghazaly's dress code has remained the same for many years to in order to show equality between students. Boys wear navy blue pants and white polo shirts while girls wear long navy blue Islamic dresses often referred to as "abaya" and red/maroon headscarves often referred to as "jilbab".

History
Between 1984 and 2013, Al-Ghazaly was located on 441 North Street in Teaneck, New Jersey. The new facility in Wayne (formerly Neumann Preparatory School and Lake View Learning Center) opened its doors to students in September 2013, with the Teaneck facility repurposed to serve students in pre-Kindergarten through third grade.

Curriculum
The students at Al-Ghazaly study standard subjects, such as math (from algebra to calculus), English, science, history. Additionally, the school includes Arabic, Quran (memorization of the holy book), tafsir (analyzing/finding deep meaning to Quran), and Islamic studies as part of the curriculum. In Islamic studies, the students learn the morals and teachings of Islam, Sunna and shariah.

The students pray Zuhr together everyday, and on Fridays, they have a Khateeb (imam) preach to them, after which they pray Jumu'ah.

Extracurricular activities
Al Ghazaly offers Forensics, Model UN, Beta Club, Art Club, Mock Trial, Model Congress, Science Olympiad, Math League, and many other extracurriculars. Students partake in random acts of kindness. Ghazaly's basketball team is the Ghazaly Warriors.

With the opening of the new school building, new sports team are being founded by the students, including a boys and girls soccer team and a flag football team.

References

External links
 Al-Ghazaly High School – Islamic Education Foundation of New Jersey
 
 Al-Ghazaly High School , National Center for Education Statistics

1984 establishments in New Jersey
Islamic schools in New Jersey
Private high schools in Passaic County, New Jersey
Private middle schools in New Jersey
Teaneck, New Jersey
Wayne, New Jersey